The Wenatchee Valley Venom were a professional indoor football team based in Wenatchee, Washington. The team was most recently a member of the Pacific Division of the Intense Conference of the Indoor Football League (IFL). The Venom were founded in 2009 as an expansion member of the American Indoor Football Association (AIFA). The Venom played their home games at Town Toyota Center.

History
On June 15, 2009, co-owner and general manager Mark Helm announced that the Wenatchee Valley Venom would become an expansion team of the American Indoor Football Association (AIFA) for the 2010 season. The ownership named Keith Evans the franchise's first head coach and assistant general manager. In January, 2010, the Venom adding Kyle Skalisky to the ownership group and named him team president. After a 2–5 start, the team fired Keith Evans and named defensive coordinator Brian Smith as the team's interim head coach. On May 28, 2010, ownership removed the interim tag from Smith and he took over as the full-time head coach. Smith guided the Venom to a 6–1 record during the remainder of the season, but the team missed the playoffs. The ownership group announced that the team would be returning for the 2011 season, but were unsure what league the franchise would play in.

On September 11, 2010, the Venom joined the Indoor Football League (IFL) for the 2011 season. The Venom won their IFL debut 45–37 over the Fairbanks Grizzlies. The Venom started 2–0, but followed with a seven-game losing streak. Recently added rookie quarterback Charles Dowdell ended the Venom's losing streak by leading them to a 41–36 victory over the Wyoming Cavalry. The Venom then lost the final four games of the season.

On June 21, 2011 The Venom announced they had ceased operations citing low ticket sales since their debut season in 2010 despite the 8–6 season. Though they moved to the more financially stable IFL for the 2011 season, the team posted a 3–11 record and continued to have issues drawing fans.

Season-by-season results

Personnel

Final roster

All-IFL players
The following Venom players have been named to All-IFL Teams:
 WR Timothy Simmons (1)

Head coaches

2011 season

Preseason

Regular season

Standings

References

External links 
 W.V. Venom's official site
 Venom's 2010 stats

 
American football teams in Washington (state)